The Reverend Horton Heat is the stage name of American musician James C. Heath (born 1959) as well as the name of his Dallas, Texas-based psychobilly trio. Heath is a singer, songwriter and guitarist. A Prick magazine reviewer called Heath the "godfather of modern rockabilly and psychobilly".

The group formed in 1986, playing its first gigs in Dallas' Deep Ellum neighborhood. The core members are Jim "Reverend Horton" Heath on guitars and lead vocals, and Jimbo Wallace on the upright bass. The band signed to Victory Records in 2012, and released its 12th studio album, Whole New Life, on November 30, 2018.

The band plays rock and roll with influences from 1950s country, surf, punk, big band, swing, and rockabilly standards.

Early career

Heath was born in Corpus Christi, Texas, where he was raised with an appreciation of rock, electric blues and rockabilly. He was influenced by country music artists such as Junior Brown, Willie Nelson, and Merle Travis. He played in local bands until 1985 when he gained notice in Dallas as "Reverend Horton Heat", the moniker bestowed by the owner of  the Deep Ellum neighborhood nightclub where he played.

Adding bassist Jimbo Wallace and drummer Taz Bentley in 1989, Reverend Horton Heat recorded for Sub Pop at Reciprocal Recording in Seattle and Crystal Clear in Dallas, which made up the majority of material on Reverend Horton Heat's debut album, Smoke 'Em If You Got 'Em (1990). For the next album, the band recorded with Gibby Haynes of the Butthole Surfers producing at Ardent Studios in Memphis: The Full-Custom Gospel Sounds of the Reverend Horton Heat (1993).

Interscope Records joined with Sub Pop to co-release the band's third album Liquor in the Front (1994). Al Jourgensen of Ministry produced the album.

Chart success
Scott Churilla replaced Bentley as drummer in the mid-1990s, and the band released It's Martini Time in 1996. The album brought the band its first Billboard chart success, reaching number 165 on the Billboard 200. The band covered the boogie standard "Rock the Joint", and the song "It's Martini Time" was a minor hit. Later that year, Heath brought his street preacher style to the television series Homicide: Life on the Street, and he appeared on The Drew Carey Show in 1997.

The 2000 album Spend a Night in the Box was released through Time Bomb Recordings, with Paul Leary producing. The style was a return to straight-ahead rockabilly songs. The album rose through CMJ charts to peak at number 2 in May.

The song "Like a Rocket" served as the theme for the 2002 Daytona 500 autosports race. The band featured the song on their next album, Lucky 7.

Victory Records signed Reverend Horton Heat in 2012, and Scott Churilla returned to the band as drummer, playing for the next five years. An album titled Rev was released on January 21, 2014. A YouTube video for a single on the album, "Let Me Teach You How to Eat," preceded the album on November 12, 2013. Rev rose to number 111 on the Billboard 200, becoming the band's highest-charting album. The band toured as opening act for Motörhead, and recorded rock and roll songs with Motörhead's Lemmy Kilmister, though the tapes are unreleased. Reverend Horton Heat also backed a number of other artists such as Unknown Hinson, Jello Biafra and Deke Dickerson.

In 2017, drummer Churilla was replaced by Arjuna "R.J." Contreras, formerly of the band Eleven Hundred Springs. Matt Jordan of West Virginia joined the band playing piano and organ as well as supporting vocals. They released the album Whole New Life in 2018.

In 2021, Heath and Wallace teamed with drummer Slim Jim Phantom (Stray Cats) to form a side project: The Jimbos.

Commercial appearances
"Psychobilly Freakout", and later "Wiggle Stick", were both featured in video segments on the show Beavis and Butt-Head. The song "I Can't Surf" was part of the soundtrack of the video game Tony Hawk's Pro Skater 3, published in 2001. "Psychobilly Freakout" was used on a commercial for Buell American Motorcycles and a slightly altered version was featured in the game Guitar Hero II and later on Guitar Hero Smash Hits. Their song "Baddest of the Bad" is featured on the soundtrack to Tony Hawk's Proving Ground. The 1997 video game Redneck Rampage also includes two of their songs, "Wiggle Stick" and "Nurture My Pig!". The song "Big Red Rocket of Love" is featured in the video games The Sims 3, MotorStorm and Need for Speed: The Run, and a slightly altered version of the song was featured in a 1999 television commercial for the Mazda Miata. The song "Pride of San Jacinto" is featured on the video game Hot Wheels Turbo Racing. The song "Let Me Teach You How to Eat" was featured in a 2017 Subway commercial. The song "Mad, Mad Heart" is featured in the video game Far Cry 5.

Equipment
Heath has a signature guitar from the Gretsch Guitar company, the 6120RHH. One of his favorite vintage guitars is a 1954 Gibson ES-175, which he rarely plays on the road since its wiring buzzes in certain venues. His favorite amplifier was the Fender Super Reverb but is now the Gretsch Executive.

Band members

Current members
Jim Heath: guitars, vocals (1985–present)
Jimbo Wallace: upright bass (1989–present)
Jonathan Jeter: drums (2020–present)

Former members
"Swingin'" Jack Barton: upright bass (1985–1989)
Bobby Baranowski: drums (1985–1989)
Kyle Thomas: drums (1989)
Patrick "Taz" Bentley: drums (1989–1994)
Tim Alexander: piano/keyboards (1996–present)
Paul Simmons: drums (2006–2012)
Scott Churilla: drums (1995–2006, 2012–2017)
Matt Jordan: piano (Sep. 2017– Feb. 2019)
Arjuna “RJ” Contreras: drums (2017-2020)

Discography

Studio albums

Collections
Holy Roller: 24 Hits (Sub Pop, 1999)
20th Century Masters – The Millennium Collection: The Best of The Reverend Horton Heat (Interscope, 2006)
25 To Life [live] (Yep Roc, 2012)

Singles
"Big Little Baby" (1988)
"Psychobilly Freakout" (1990)
"400 Bucks / Caliénte" (split with The Supersuckers) (1994)
"One Time for Me" (1994) No. 40 Alternative songs
"Lie Detector" (1998)
"King" (1999)
"It Was a Very Good Year" (2000)
"Let Me Teach You How to Eat" (2013)
"It's a Rave Up!/Beer, Write This Song" (2015)
"Hardscrabble Woman/Lying to Myself" (2016)

DVDs
Live and In Color (2003)
Reverend Horton Heat: Revival (2004)

Soundtracks
Film
Love and a .45 – "The Devil's Chasing Me" (1994)
Ace Ventura: When Nature Calls – "Watusi Rodeo" (1995)
Bio-Dome – "Psychobilly Freakout" (1996)
Free Willy 3: The Rescue – "Big Sky" (1997)
Major League: Back to the Minors – "Baby I'm Drunk" (1998)
The Flintstones in Viva Rock Vegas – "Rock the Joint" (2000)
Auto Focus – "Real Gone Lover" (2002)

Television
Homicide: Life on the Street (episode #4.17 "Full Moon") – "In Your Wildest Dreams" (1996)
Cleveland Rocks! Music from The Drew Carey Show – "Now, Right Now" (1998)
Dexter: New Blood (episode #8 "Unfair Game") – "Baddest of the Bad" (2021)

Video games
Redneck Rampage – "Nurture My Pig" and "Wiggle Stick" (1997)
Space Bunnies Must Die! – "In Your Wildest Dreams" (1998)
Hot Wheels Turbo Racing – "Pride of San Jacinto" (1999)
Tony Hawk's Pro Skater 3 – "I Can't Surf" (2001)
Guitar Hero II – "Psychobilly Freakout" (2006)
MotorStorm – "Big Red Rocket of Love" (2007)
Tony Hawk's Proving Ground – "Baddest of the Bad" (2007)
The Sims 3 Fast Lane Stuff – "Big Red Rocket of Love" (2010)
Need for Speed: The Run – "Big Red Rocket of Love" (2011)
Steep – "Chasing Rainbows" (2016)

Film appearances
Love and a .45 (1994) "Loaded Gun" was performed by the Reverend Horton Heat in the film, but does not appear on the soundtrack album.

See also
List of psychobilly bands

References

Bibliography
Miller, Lewis. "Reverend Horton Heat."  College Music Journal. Retrieved May 11, 2005.
Wenzler, Matt. "Big Dwarf Rodeo."  Retrieved May 11, 2005.

External links

1985 establishments in Texas
American psychobilly musical groups
Interscope Records artists
Musical groups established in 1985
Musical groups from Dallas
Musical quartets
Rock music groups from Texas
Rockabilly music groups
Sub Pop artists